The following is a list of destinations to which China Eastern Airlines operates.

List

References

 China Eastern Airlines route map

Lists of airline destinations
China Eastern Airlines
SkyTeam destinations